Addepalli Ramamohana Rao was a noted Telugu poet and literary critic from India.

Early life
He was born in Chintalaguntapalem village in Machilipatnam of Andhra Pradesh, India on 6 September 1936.

Works
He penned 13 compilations of poetry, 25 books on literary criticism and 600 books on various genres.

Awards
Praja Kavi

References

1936 births
2016 deaths
Telugu poets
Indian literary critics
Indian male poets
People from Machilipatnam
People from Krishna district
Poets from Andhra Pradesh